Brynmor Thomas John (18 April 1934 – 13 December 1988) was a British Labour politician.

John was Member of Parliament for Pontypridd in South Wales from 1970 until his death. During the Labour government of 1974 to 1979, he was a junior Defence minister for the Royal Air Force (RAF) (1974–1976), a Home Office minister (1976–1979) and Shadow Secretary of State for Defence (1980–1981).

The circumstances of his later life and premature death are cited by physicians who believe the extensive evidence for the biological etiology of chronic fatigue syndrome. Brynmor John had been diagnosed with the illness, and died suddenly immediately after exiting the House of Commons gym. He had been following an exercise regime based on what is argued to be unfounded and unethical medical advice: that sufferers may exercise their way toward a cure for the illness.

References

Sources
Times Guide to the House of Commons, 1987 and 1992 editions.

External links 
 The National Library for Wales:Dictionary of Welsh Biography
 

|-

1934 births
1988 deaths
Welsh Labour Party MPs
People educated at Pontypridd High School
UK MPs 1970–1974
UK MPs 1974
UK MPs 1974–1979
UK MPs 1979–1983
UK MPs 1983–1987
UK MPs 1987–1992